Tanacu is a commune in Vaslui County, Western Moldavia, Romania. It is composed of two villages, Benești and Tanacu. It included Muntenii de Sus and Satu Nou villages from 1968 to 2004, when these were split off to form Muntenii de Sus Commune.

The commune is the site of the Tanacu monastery, where the Tanacu exorcism occurred.

References

Communes in Vaslui County
Localities in Western Moldavia